Riolândia is a municipality in the state of São Paulo, Brazil. The city has a population of 12,689 inhabitants and an area of 633.4 km².

Riolândia belongs to the Mesoregion of São José do Rio Preto.

References

Municipalities in São Paulo (state)